Christina Yvonne Cole (born August 4, 1943) is an American actress and singer. She is best known for her role as Katie Miller Douglas on the sitcom My Three Sons (1967–1972).

Family
Cole is the daughter of Yvonne King and Buddy Cole. She has a sister, Cathy Green, and four children.

Career
Early in her acting career she had a recurring role as Sunny Day in the detective series Hawaiian Eye (1963). In 1963, she played the minor (uncredited) role of Ruth Stewart in Palm Springs Weekend, a spring break party film set in Palm Springs, California. While her more famous role on My Three Sons was her role as Katie Miller Douglas, she also appeared previously in the series as a friend of Robbie (circa 1966), cast in the role of Joanne, before the Katie role was created. She also was on the show as Sherry in the fifth season. She had single appearances in various television series in the early 1970s, To Rome with Love, The Rookies and Adam-12. In 1976 she appeared as a singer in Eleanor and Franklin (miniseries), an ABC TV miniseries, and a singing appearance again in its sequel the next year.

Cole was also a member of the Four King Cousins, a subgroup quartet of the King Family Singers.

Later life
After leaving television, Cole was the director of the Sacramento Children's Theatre. She was an acting coach at the John Robert Powers acting schools in Roseville and Elk Grove, California, and in 2013 returned to on-screen acting.

In late 2013, she performed with her King Cousins (sister Cathy and cousins Candy and Carolyn) and made a one-off appearance at the Catalina Jazz Club in Hollywood in November. They made subsequent appearances at the same club in April 2014 and August 2016. She is a member of the Church of Jesus Christ of Latter-day Saints.

References

External links
 
 Official Tina Cole Website
 Official King Family Website

1943 births
American women singers
American film actresses
American television actresses
Living people
Actresses from Sacramento, California
Actresses from Hollywood, Los Angeles
Singers from Los Angeles
American acting coaches
People from Roseville, California
Musicians from Sacramento, California
King family (show business)
Latter Day Saints from California
20th-century American actresses
21st-century American women